LFC may refer to:

 Canadian Forces Land Force Command, a former name of the Canadian Army
 Lake Forest College, an American educational institution
 Landau Forte College, a City Academy in Derby, England
  (French Legion of Fighters), an organization of the Vichy regime, parent of the Service d'ordre légionnaire
 León Febres Cordero, former President of Ecuador
 Level of free convection, a specific altitude in the atmosphere
 Lingua Franca Core, a set of English pronunciation features
 Los Fabulosos Cadillacs, an Argentine band
 Lost-foam casting, a type of evaporative-pattern casting process
 Lutheran Free Church a US-based Lutheran church from 1897 to 1963
 Lycée Français du Caire, a French school in Cairo, Egypt
 Low Framerate Compensation, a software technique used in the drivers for AMD's Radeon graphics cards
 Log Fold change
In football:
 Laos F.C., a football club from the Philippines
 Lewes F.C., a football club from East Sussex in England
 Limoges FC, a football club from Limoges in France
 Linfield F.C., a football club in Belfast, Northern Ireland
 Linköpings FC, a football club from Linköping in Sweden
 Liverpool F.C., a football club in Liverpool, England
 Livingston F.C., a football club from West Lothian in Scotland
 Ladies' Football Club, used as part of the name of some clubs in women's association football